The Hall of Four Heavenly Kings or Four Heavenly Kings Hall, referred to as Hall of Heavenly Kings, is the first important hall inside a shanmen (mount gate) in Chinese Buddhist temples and is named due to the Four Heavenly Kings statues enshrined in the hall.

Maitreya Buddha is enshrined in the Hall of Heavenly King and at the back of his statue is a statue of Skanda Bodhisattva facing the northern Mahavira Hall. In Buddhism, the Maitreya Buddha, also the future Buddha is Sakyamuni's successor. In the history of Chinese Buddhism, Maitreya Buddha has the handsome image in which he wears a coronet on his head and yingluo on his body and his hands pose in mudras. Carrying a sack on his shoulder, he always begged in the markets and streets, laughing. So local people called him "The Sack Monk". When he reached his Parinirvana, he left a Buddhist Gatha: "Maitreya, the true Maitreya, has thousands of hundreds of millions of manifestations, often instructing people of their time, even when they themselves do not recognize him." So he was seen as the manifestation of Maitreya Buddha. Since then, in Chinese Buddhist temples, Maitreya statues were shaped into a big fat monk's image with a big head and ears, laughing with his upper body exposed and cross-legged.

The Skanda Bodhisattva behind him is the Dharmapalass of Buddhist temples. As with Maitreya Buddha, the Skanda Bodhisattva's image has changed into that of a handsome ancient Chinese general who wore armors, and held a vajra in hand.

Four Heavenly Kings' statues are enshrined in the left and right side of the Four Heavenly Kings Hall. There are the eastern Dhṛtarāṣṭra (Dhṛtarāṣṭra wears white clothes and armor and has a pipa, a Chinese plucked string musical instrument, in his hand), the southern Virūḍhaka (Virūḍhaka wears blue clothes with a sword in his hand), the western Virūpākṣa (Virūpākṣa wears red clothes with a dragon or a snake wrapped around his arm), and the northern Vaiśravaṇa (Vaiśravaṇa wears green clothes with a precious umbrella in his right hand and a silver sacred mouse in his left hand). The Four Heavenly Kings are said to live in Mount Meru and their task is to protect the world in their direction respectively.

References

Further reading

External links

Buddhist architecture
Chinese Buddhist architecture
Four Heavenly Kings